Omnitool or Omni-tool may refer to:

 Omnitool, a lock-picking tool in the Artemis Fowl series
 Omni-tool, a holographic interface device in Mass Effect
 OmniTool, a keycard/scanning device in the video game Soma

See also
 Multi-tool, any one of a range of portable, versatile hand tools that combines several individual functions in a single unit